Uli the Farmhand (German: Uli, der Knecht) is a 1954 Swiss romantic comedy film directed by Franz Schnyder and starring Hannes Schmidhauser, Liselotte Pulver and Heinrich Gretler. It is based on the classic 1841 novel of the same name by Jeremias Gotthelf. It tells of a wayward young man who eventually settles down.

It was a popular box office success, drawing more than a million and a half viewers in Switzerland. It was also exported to Austria and West Germany, enjoying success in these countries as well. It was followed by a sequel Uli the Tenant.

Production
The film's sets were designed by the art director Max Röthlisberger. It was made with backing from the Swiss government, and had a budget of around 600,000 Swiss Francs. Leopold Lindtberg was originally planned to direct the film, but was replaced by Schnyder. It was shot at the Rosenhof Studios in Zurich and on location around Bern.

Cast

References

Bibliography 
 Goble, Alan. The Complete Index to Literary Sources in Film. Walter de Gruyter, 1999.

External links 
 

1954 films
1954 romantic comedy films
1950s historical comedy films
Swiss historical comedy films
Swiss German-language films
Films directed by Franz Schnyder
Films based on Swiss novels
Films set in the 19th century
Films set in the Alps
Films shot in Zürich
Swiss black-and-white films
Adaptations of works by Jeremias Gotthelf